Maybe It's Because I'm a Londoner is a 1944 British song composed by Hubert Gregg. Gregg, a pre-war broadcaster for the BBC, was on leave during the Second World War when he wrote the work. It has been recorded by a number of artists including Bud Flanagan and David Jones.

References

Bibliography
Evans, Anne-Marie . Time, the City, and the Literary Imagination. Springer Nature, 2020.

British songs
1944 songs
Culture in London

Songs about London